The 2016 Liverpool City Council election took place on 5 May 2016 to elect members of Liverpool City Council in England. This was on the same day as the election for the Elected Mayor of Liverpool and the Police and Crime Commissioner for Merseyside.

Due to the 'in thirds' system of election, one third of the council were up for election, with direct comparisons to previous results made with the corresponding vote at the 2012 Liverpool City Council election. There were two by-elections in Belle Vale and Norris Green wards, so these wards each elected two councillors.

Council composition
Prior to the election the composition of the council was:

After the election the composition of the council was:

Election result in 2016

Ward results
* - Existing Councillor seeking re-election.

Allerton and Hunts Cross

Anfield

Belle Vale

Central

Childwall

Church

Clubmoor

County

Cressington

Croxteth

Everton

Fazakerley

Greenbank

Kensington and Fairfield

Kirkdale

Knotty Ash

Mossley Hill

Norris Green

Old Swan

Picton

Prince's Park

Riverside

St. Michael's

Speke-Garston

Tuebrook & Stoneycroft

Warbreck

Wavertree

West Derby

Woolton

Yew Tree

Changes between 2016 and 2018

The resignation of Labour councillor Helen Casstles (Wavertree, elected 5 May 2016) in March 2017 triggered a by-election:

The resignation of Labour councillor Beatrice Fraenkel (Kirkdale, elected 7 May 2015) in March 2017 triggered a by-election:

Councillor Frank Prendergast (Everton, elected 2016) resigned the Labour whip in March 2018.

Labour councillor Jacqui Taylor (Knotty Ash, elected 2015) resigned from the council in March 2018. A by-election will be held for the seat, term ending 2019, along with the ordinary election for the seat in the ward whose term is up, on 3 May 2018.

The death of veteran Labour councillor John McIntosh (Everton, elected 2014) was announced on 29 March 2018. His term would have ended on 3 May 2018 and will be filled at the ordinary election.

See also

 Liverpool City Council
 Liverpool Town Council elections 1835 - 1879
 Liverpool City Council elections 1880–present
 Mayors and Lord Mayors of Liverpool 1207 to present
 History of local government in England

References

2016 English local elections
2016
2010s in Liverpool